Balance is the debut album of the Dutch singer Kim-Lian. It was released on 25 May 2004 in the Netherlands. Kim-Lian said the album to be "a fun pop/rock album". The album spawned four top 20 singles, being "Teenage Superstar", "Hey Boy", "Garden of Love" and Kim Wilde cover "Kids in America".

Track listing

Singles

Chart performance

2004 debut albums
Kim-Lian albums